Olga Jonasson, MD, FACS (August 12, 1934 – August 30, 2006) was an American transplant surgeon. She performed the first kidney transplant in the state of Illinois. She was also the first woman to be appointed head of an academic department of surgery at a coeducational school of medicine (Ohio State University) and the first woman to be appointed chief of surgery of a major medical center.

Early life and education
Olga Jonasson was born in Peoria, Illinois on August 12, 1934. During her childhood she moved with her family to Chicago, where her mother worked as a nurse and her father served as a Lutheran minister at Ebenezer Lutheran Church. Jonasson's family moved to Connecticut briefly when she was 16, but Jonasson remained in Chicago and began her studies at Northwestern University.

In 1956, Jonasson started medical school at the University of Illinois College of Medicine. While in medical school, Jonasson was elected to Alpha Omega Alpha, a national medical honor society. Jonasson completed her residency at the University of Illinois. After her residency, Jonasson spent a year at Walter Reed Army Institute of Research in Washington D.C. where she had a postdoctoral Fellowship under Dr. Elmer Becker in which she studied immunohistochemistry. She then had another year long research and clinical fellowship under at Massachusetts General Hospital in Boston where she studied transplantation immunobiology under Dr. Henry J. Winn and Dr. Paul S. Russell.

Medical career
In 1963, Jonasson was named an instructor in surgery at the University of Illinois. In 1965, she was certified by the American Board of Surgery. She was the 37th women to be certified. In 1968, she developed the department of transplantation at the University of Illinois. In 1969, she performed the first kidney transplant in the state of Illinois. In 1974, she became a founding member of the National Tissue Typing and Histocompatibility Organization. In 1977, Jonasson was named chief of surgery of Cook County Hospital. This made her the first women to be appointed chief of surgery of a major hospital. In 1987, she left Cook County Hospital when she was named Robert M. Zollinger Professor of Surgery at the Ohio State University. This made her the first woman to head an academic. department of surgery at a coeducational medical college.

Personal life
Jonasson dedicated much of her free time to working for causes she cared about. In the 1990s she raised $3 million for the major reconstruction of her church, the Church of the Epiphany. She also volunteered hundreds of hours of her time doing work on the interior of the church during its renovation. Jonasson was also known to invite students into her home for her monthly dinner, the Chief's club. During this dinner chief residents would be welcomed into her home and given the opportunity to speak with leading experts in the medical field. This tradition lasted for three decades. Olga Jonasson died at Northwestern Memorial Hospital of T-cell lymphoma, on August 30, 2006. At the time, few of her friends and colleague knew she was sick because she was known for not complaining about her own personal issues. At the time of her death was survived by her two sisters.

Awards and acclamations
Honorary member of the American College of Black Academic Surgeons for her work mentoring minority surgeons.
1971: Outstanding Educator in America Award
1988: Honorary Fellow of the Royal College of Surgeons of England
2002: Elizabeth Blackwell Medal

References

1934 births
2006 deaths
American transplant surgeons
Northwestern University alumni
University of Illinois College of Medicine alumni
University of Illinois faculty
Ohio State University faculty
Fellows of the American College of Surgeons
Honorary Fellows of the Royal College of Surgeons
20th-century American women physicians
20th-century American physicians
Women surgeons
20th-century surgeons
American women academics
21st-century American women